Balram Chainrai (Nepali: बलराम चैनराई, also known as Balu) is the son of P. G. Chainrai, a British Gorkha Army. He is of Nepali origin. Born in October, 1958, and educated in Hong Kong, Chainrai speaks several languages and is fluent in Cantonese, English and Sindhi. Having started his business career quite early in life, Chainrai soon established himself as a leading business man in Hong Kong.

His core company, Hornington Enterprises Limited was incorporated in 1984 in Hong Kong. The company is involved in the manufacture and trading of electronic good, home appliances, toys; distribution of computers and related accessories, and trade finance activities, with an annual turnover in excess of INR 200 K.

The company's trading operations spanned several countries in Asia, Middle East, Europe, East Europe, Ukraine and Russia.

Chainrai is a philanthropist and involved with many charities worldwide. He is a Rotarian, and member of several other social organisations. He was vice chairman of the Indian Chamber of Commerce of Hong Kong from 2001 to 2006 before he became the President of the Chamber in 2007. In that capacity, Chainrai was part of several trade delegations together with top government officials and businessmen of Hong Kong to other countries.
 he holds the position of vice chairman of the chamber. He is also one of "The One", a charity organization to find the one person each year, who has contributed to the world unselfishly.

Chainrai's involvement and interests now include investments in property, hotels, the entertainment industry and solar power projects. Chainrai also briefly owned Portsmouth Football Club, an English Premier League Club. He has a son, Karan Chainrai, who was seen stepping onto the pitch at the FA Cup Final in 2010 where Portsmouth faced Chelsea for the title.

References

Hong Kong business executives
Living people
People from Okhaldhunga District
Hong Kong people of Nepalese descent
Nepalese expatriates in Hong Kong
Year of birth missing (living people)